The Minister for Equal Opportunities (Italian: Ministro per le Pari Opportunità) in Italy is one of the positions in the Italian government.

The current minister is Eugenia Roccella, who is serving in the government of Giorgia Meloni.

List of Ministers
 Parties

References

Equal Opportunities